Paul Kevin Whybrew,  (born 1959) is a British former courtier to the Royal Households of the United Kingdom. He served as Page of the Backstairs to Queen Elizabeth II until her death on 8 September 2022.

Role
His role as personal page to the Queen required that he catered to a significant proportion of her daily needs. He was given accommodation by the Queen at Windsor Castle, Balmoral Castle and Sandringham House.

Whybrew was one of a number of long-time, loyal staff to keep the Queen company in her final days at Balmoral.

Incident
In 1982, Whybrew spoke to Michael Fagan. Fagan had evaded security and broken into the royal bedroom at Buckingham Palace.

Honours
In addition to his honours, Whybrew was appointed serjeant-at-arms to the Queen in 2008. The role was first established in the 12th Century.

Having already been appointed Member of the Royal Victorian Order (MVO), Whybrew was appointed Lieutenant of the Royal Victorian Order (LVO) during the Queen's Diamond Jubilee Honours. Already a holder of the Royal Victorian Medal (RVM) in Silver, he was awarded the Royal Victorian Medal in Gold in the 2016 Birthday Honours. He has received the Queen Elizabeth II Version of the Royal Household Long and Faithful Service Medal for service to the Royal Family.

Personal life
He attended Clacton County High School. He was also known as "Tall Paul" in contrast to another of the Queen's footmen, Paul Burrell, who was known as "Small Paul".

Whybrew appeared in the Buckingham Palace scenes of the short comedic film Happy and Glorious, featured in the opening ceremonies of the 2012 Summer Olympics, in which the Queen is seen jumping out of a helicopter with James Bond (Daniel Craig).

References

1959 births
Living people
Lieutenants of the Royal Victorian Order
Place of birth missing (living people)
Recipients of the Royal Victorian Medal